The Plasma Physics Laboratory at the University of Saskatchewan was established in 1959 by H. M. Skarsgard. Early work centered on research with a Betatron.

Facilities

STOR-1M
STOR-1M is Canada's first tokamak built in 1983.  In 1987 STOR-1M was the world’s first demonstration of alternating current in a tokamak.

STOR-M

STOR-M stands for Saskatchewan Torus-Modified. STOR-M is a tokamak located at the University of Saskatchewan.  STOR-M is a small tokamak (major radius = 46 cm, minor radius = 12.5 cm) designed for studying plasma heating, anomalous transport and developing novel tokamak operation modes and advanced diagnostics.  STOR-M is capable of a 30–40 millisecond plasma discharge with a toroidal magnetic field of between 0.5 and 1 tesla and a plasma current of between 20 and 50 kiloamperes.  STOR-M has also demonstrated improved confinement induced by a turbulent heating pulse, electrode biasing and compact torus injection.

References

External links

Fusion power
Nuclear research institutes
Research institutes in Canada
University of Saskatchewan
Plasma physics facilities
Tokamaks